The Maggie L. Walker National Historic Site is a United States National Historic Landmark and a National Historic Site located at 110½ E. Leigh Street on "Quality Row" in the Jackson Ward neighborhood of Richmond, Virginia.  The site was designated a U.S. National Historic Landmark in 1975.  The National Historic Site was established in 1978 to tell the story of the life and work of Maggie L. Walker (1867-1934), the first woman to serve as president of a bank in the United States. It was built by George W. Boyd, father of physician, Sarah Garland Boyd Jones. The historic site protects the restored and originally furnished home of Walker. Tours of the home are offered by National Park Service rangers.

Description
The Maggie Walker NHS is located north of downtown Richmond, in the city's historically black Jackson Ward neighborhood.  It consists of six buildings on the north side of East Leigh Street, including 110 A E. Leigh Street, 112 E. Leigh Street, 114 East Leigh Street, 600 North 2nd Street, and 602 North 2nd Street.  Most of these buildings have exteriors reflective of the early 20th century, with their interiors repurposed to house Park Service facilities, including a museum and visitor center, as well as curatorial spaces.

The centerpiece of the site is the Maggie Walker House, a two-story Victorian Gothic brick rowhouse located near the center of the block of East Leigh between 1st and 2nd Streets.  A Colonial Revival porch with sunroom above covers the front of the house.  The interior is furnished with original belongings of Maggie Lena Walker, and period furnishings dating to the 1920s and 1930s.  The house, complete with Walker's effects, was donated to the people of the United States by her descendants in 1979.

History

Maggie Walker, the daughter of a slave, was a pioneering African-American businesswoman and civil rights activist.  She was an influential member of the NAACP, and is credited with founding the first African-American, female-owned bank, St. Luke's Penny Bank (long since folded by mergers into other institutions), in 1902.  She was also involved in local philanthropic efforts, supporting schools for education African-American girls in Richmond.

See also
List of National Historic Landmarks in Virginia
National Register of Historic Places listings in Richmond, Virginia

References

External links 
 
 NPS Maggie L. Walker National Historic Site website

Houses on the National Register of Historic Places in Virginia
National Historic Sites in Virginia
Museums in Richmond, Virginia
Historic house museums in Virginia
Houses completed in 1909
Walker, Maggie
Gothic Revival architecture in Virginia
Women's museums in the United States
Houses in Richmond, Virginia
African-American history in Richmond, Virginia
National Register of Historic Places in Richmond, Virginia
Individually listed contributing properties to historic districts on the National Register in Virginia
National Historic Landmarks in Virginia
History of women in Virginia
African-American historic house museums
National Historic Landmark District contributing properties